Henry Ewan Golding (born 5 February 1987) is a Malaysian and British actor and television host. Golding has been a presenter on BBC's The Travel Show since 2014. He is known for his film work, playing the role of Nick Young in Crazy Rich Asians (2018), the title character in the action-adventure Snake Eyes (2021), Sean Townsend in the thriller A Simple Favor (2018), and Tom in the romantic comedy Last Christmas (2019), the latter two directed by Paul Feig.

Early life
Golding was born in Sarawak in the district of Betong, Malaysia. His mother, Margaret Likan Golding, is a native-born Sarawakian of indigenous Dayak Iban ancestry. His father, Clive Golding, is British. The family lived for almost five years in Terengganu, before moving to Surrey, England, when Henry was eight years old. There he went to The Warwick School, Redhill. He moved to Kuala Lumpur when he was 21 to pursue on-camera roles after working as a hairdresser on Sloane Street in London for a couple of years.

Career

In March 2017, after a global casting call, it was announced that Golding would star in the film Crazy Rich Asians alongside Constance Wu. He was first brought to director Jon M. Chu's attention by accountant Lisa-Kim Ling Kuan, and Golding's charm and personality quickly won him his first acting role. Crazy Rich Asians was released in the United States and Canada on 15 August 2018 by Warner Bros. Pictures and was met with high critical praise, becoming the number one movie in U.S. and Canadian theatres over its opening weekend. A month later, Golding appeared in Paul Feig's thriller A Simple Favor, co-starring Blake Lively and Anna Kendrick, playing Sean, the husband of Lively's character. Following the success of Crazy Rich Asians, and, to a lesser extent, A Simple Favor, Golding was cast opposite Emilia Clarke in the romantic comedy Last Christmas, directed by Feig (in their second collaboration). Filming commenced on 26 November 2018 and continued until February 2019, and the film was released on 8 November 2019.

Golding starred alongside Matthew McConaughey, Hugh Grant, and Michelle Dockery in The Gentlemen, a 2019 crime film directed by Guy Ritchie. Golding went on to star in Monsoon, a Hong Khaou film, as Kit, a man who travels from London to his birth country of Vietnam to scatter his parents' ashes.

In August 2019, Golding was cast in the title role of Snake Eyes, a spin-off from the G.I. Joe movie franchise, which was released in July 2021. Filming for Snakes Eyes began in October 2019 in Vancouver, and wrapped in February 2020 in Tokyo.

Upcoming projects 
On 29 April 2019, CNBC reported that Golding is to reprise his role as Nick Young in the back-to-back filming of two sequels to Crazy Rich Asians, which are currently in pre-production.

Golding stars in spy movie Assassin Club along with Noomi Rapace, Sam Neill, and Daniela Melchior, with Camille Delamarre directing and screenplay by Thomas C. Dunn. Production on the film has been wrapped in Turin, Italy.

Personal life
Golding met Liv Lo, a Taiwanese television presenter and yoga instructor, on New Year's Day 2011. They became engaged in 2015, and were married in August 2016 in Sarawak. The couple live in Venice Beach, California with their daughter Lyla.

Before his marriage, Golding completed his bejalai—the Iban rite of passage into manhood—in the wilderness of Borneo, filming the experience over two months (and carrying the camera equipment himself) for the documentary series Surviving Borneo on Discovery Channel Asia. His journey ended in him receiving a traditional hand-tapped bejalai tattoo by Ernesto Kalum of Borneoheadhunters Tattoo in Kuching, Sarawak. The tattoo on his right thigh is a fig tree that wraps around other trees and takes their form to become the tree itself.

When interviewed by Michele Manelis of The New Zealand Herald, Golding said of his surname, "Golding is really darn Jewish, isn't it? My grandfather during the war was in London and as the story goes, he was possibly adopted by a Jewish family by that name. Out of respect he took on their name and it was passed down. So, I'm proud to be an honorary Jew."

Filmography

Film

Television

Awards and nominations

References

External links

Living people
1987 births
21st-century British male actors
British male actors of Asian descent
British people of Malaysian descent
British male film actors
British male television actors
Iban people
Malaysian people of British descent
Malaysian male film actors
Male actors from Surrey
People from Sarawak
People from Terengganu